This is a list of Suzhou Rail Transit stations.

Stations 

stations